The UWI Blackbirds or Cave Hill Blackbirds, are the official athletic teams of the University of the West Indies at Cave Hill.

Sports 
The following thirteen sports are offered.

 Aerobics
 Basketball
 Chess
 Cricket
 Football (soccer)
 Hockey (field hockey)
 Lawn Tennis
 Netball
 Swimming
 Table Tennis
 Taekwondo 
 Track and Field
 Volleyball

Football 

The football team plays in the Barbados Premier Division, the top flight of football on the island.

See also 

University of the West Indies

References 

University and college sports clubs in Barbados